Zargar-e Goli Bolaghi (also Romanized as Zargar-e Golī Bolāghī; also known as Zargar-e Golī Bolāgh) is a village in Arshaq-e Gharbi Rural District, Moradlu District, Meshgin Shahr County, Ardabil Province, Iran. At the 2006 census, its population was 259, in 48 families.

References 

Towns and villages in Meshgin Shahr County